Anita Lonsbrough,  (born 10 August 1941 in York), later known by her married name Anita Porter, is a former swimmer from Great Britain who won a gold medal at the 1960 Summer Olympics.

Swimming career
At the 1958 British Empire and Commonwealth Games in Cardiff she won gold in the 220 yards breaststroke and the medley relay.

At the 1960 Summer Olympics in Rome, on 27 August 1960, at the age of 19, she won gold in the 200 m breaststroke in 2:49.5 ahead of West Germany's Wiltrud Urselmann (2:50.0), setting a new world record time. She was one of only two GB gold medallists that year, the other being Don Thompson in the 50 kilometre walk.

She would also be the last British woman to win Olympic gold in swimming until Rebecca Adlington gained the gold in the 2008 Summer Olympics, 48 years later.

At the 1962 British Empire and Commonwealth Games in Perth she won three golds: 110 yards breaststroke; 220 yards breaststroke; and 440 yards individual medley.

She won the 1963 ASA National Championship 220 yards freestyle title, and was a five times winner of the National Championship 220 yards breaststroke title, which included a world record in the 1962 final. She also won the 440 yards medley title twice in 1963 and 1964.

In 1964 she competed in the Tokyo Olympic Games, finishing 7th in the 400 metres individual medley. She was also to compete in the 400 metres freestyle, but did not start.

Biography
Lonsbrough was born in York to Stanley and Maud, and spent her childhood in India where her father, a Sergeant Major in the Coldstream Guards, was posted. After the family’s return to Yorkshire, she was educated at St. Joseph's Catholic College, Bradford, a girls' direct grant grammar school. She became a Treasurer's Office clerk employed at the Huddersfield Town Hall. She won her first gold medal for swimming in the 1958 British Empire and Commonwealth Games in Cardiff. Five world records and seven gold medals followed until her retirement in 1964. At one time she held the Olympic, Empire and European titles at the same time.

She is married to cycling commentator and former leading British professional track cyclist Hugh Porter; they met travelling to Tokyo for the 1964 Summer Olympics and married on Thursday 17 June 1965 at St Peter's Church, Huddersfield. The couple live in Tettenhall, Wolverhampton, and, after a spell teaching swimming including the P.E. Dept at Ounsdale High School, she is currently a sports commentator and journalist for The Daily Telegraph, under the name Anita Lonsbrough-Porter.

Honours

She was the first woman winner of BBC Sports Personality of the Year in 1962. and was the last person to win the 'Sports Outlook' trophy Northern Sports Star of the year award in 1962

She was awarded an MBE in 1963 for services to swimming.

Anita Lonsbrough was the first female flag bearer for Great Britain at the Summer Games when she carried the flag in the opening ceremony of the 1964 Summer Olympics, after previously turning down the role at the 1960 Summer Olympics.

In 1983 she was inducted into the International Swimming Hall of Fame.

See also
 List of members of the International Swimming Hall of Fame
 List of Olympic medalists in swimming (women)
 World record progression 200 metres breaststroke
 World record progression 4 × 100 metres medley relay

References

External links
 BBC Sport - "Rider's legends: Anita Lonsbrough"
 British Olympic Association - Rome 1960 
 
 
 International Olympic Committee results database
 My Yorkshire - Anita talks about the 1960 Olympics victory 
 
 

1941 births
Living people
English female swimmers
English Olympic medallists
Olympic swimmers of Great Britain
Swimmers at the 1958 British Empire and Commonwealth Games
Swimmers at the 1960 Summer Olympics
Swimmers at the 1962 British Empire and Commonwealth Games
Swimmers at the 1964 Summer Olympics
Olympic gold medallists for Great Britain
BBC Sports Personality of the Year winners
Sportspeople from York
People educated at St. Joseph's Catholic College, Bradford
Members of the Order of the British Empire
Commonwealth Games gold medallists for England
Commonwealth Games silver medallists for England
World record setters in swimming
Female breaststroke swimmers
Female medley swimmers
European Aquatics Championships medalists in swimming
Medalists at the 1960 Summer Olympics
Olympic gold medalists in swimming
Commonwealth Games medallists in swimming
Medallists at the 1958 British Empire and Commonwealth Games
Medallists at the 1962 British Empire and Commonwealth Games